Zarmehr (also known as Zarmeh, Zarmihr, Zīrmeh, and Zīr Mehr) is a village in Azghand Rural District, Shadmehr District, Mahvelat County, Razavi Khorasan Province, Iran. At the 2006 census, its population was 727, spread over 235 families.

References 

Populated places in Mahvelat County